This is a sub-article to Al-Hashr.
Al-Hashr, 6 is the sixth ayat of Chapter 59 of the Qur'an, and relates to the controversies of the land of Fadak.

Overview
:

Exegesis
This verse is said to relate to the land of Fadak. The words translated as "restored", "afaa", is related to Fay:

Sunni view
 writes that, "This verse was revealed with regard to Fadak, which the Prophet (s) acquired as it was conquered without any fighting.

Other Sunni tafsir that confirm Fadak was Fay property include:
Tafsir al-Mazhari, p238
Ruh al-Ma'ani, Tafsir Surah Hashr.
Tafsir Muraghi, Tafsir Surah Hashr.
Dur al-Manthur, Tafsir Surah Hashr.
Tafsir Juwahir Tantawi, Tafseer Surah Hashr.

However, as opposed to all other Sunni historians, Shah Waliullah and Ibn Taymiyyah do not accept that Fadak was in possession of Muhammad.

 writes:

Shi'a view
 writes regarding this verse:

References

Quranic verses
Al-Hashr